Khayyam Sarhadi (12 June 1948 – 3 February 2011 born as Khayyam Sethi) was a Pakistani film and television actor and a radio personality.

Early life 
Khayyam Sarhadi was born to a Muslim family on 12 June 1948 in Bombay, in the home of parents Zia Sarhadi and Zahira Ghaznavi and grew up there. Later he moved to Karachi, Pakistan and stayed there for some time and later moved to Lahore, Pakistan.

His maternal grandfather, Rafiq Ghaznavi, was a well-known musician and since both his parents were writers, he was into showbiz from an early age. Khayyam travelled to the United States where he got his master's degree in cinematography. He also had a master's degree in English literature and Fine Arts.

Personal life 
Khayyam Sarhadi was married to a TV actress Atiya Sharaf. Later, the couple divorced and he married a film actress Saiqa. He had four daughters one from Atiya and three from Saiqa, one of his daughters is Zarghuna Khayyam. Sarhadi was a son of a famous film director, producer and writer Zia Sarhadi and his mother was a writer named Zahra Sarhadi.

He was the uncle of a model and actress Zhalay Sarhadi.

Career 
In the 1970s, after the death of his mother, Khayyam Sarhadi returned to Pakistan. In Pakistan, Sarhadi started his career from acting and directing theatre plays and later started working in TV dramas with Pakistan Television Corporation (PTV) where he was spotted and picked up by noted PTV producer Yawar Hayat Khan. Since then he had worked in thousands of TV dramas and also directed a few of them. He also worked in some films. His scripts were made in Roman letters because he couldn't read Urdu well.

Death and legacy
Khayyam Sarhadi died of a sudden heart attack during the shooting of a TV drama serial on 3 February 2011 at the age of 62 in Lahore. His funeral was held at his residence in Defence Housing Authority, Lahore.

After his death, veteran Pakistani actor/director Jawed Sheikh paid tributes to him by saying that he had worked together with him and remembers Sarhadi as a versatile actor and fun to be with.

Filmography 
Qurbani (1981)
 Bol (2011)
 Jinnah (1998) (played the role of Sardar Abdul Rab Nishtar)
 The Blood of Hussain (1980)

TV play 
TV drama serials in which he has appeared:

Awards 
 Pride of Performance Award (1991) from the President of Pakistan 
 Nigar Award
 PTV National Award

References

External links 
  (TV Plays of Khayyam Sarhadi)
 

1948 births
2011 deaths
Pakistani male film actors
Nigar Award winners
Pakistani male television actors
Pakistani radio personalities
Male actors from Mumbai
Male actors from Lahore
Male actors from Karachi
Radio personalities from Lahore
Muhajir people
Radio personalities from Karachi
Recipients of the Pride of Performance